Hajjiabad-e Khvoriad (also Romanized as Ḩājjīābād-e Khvorīād; also known as Hājī Ābād, Ḩājjīābād, Ḩājjīābād-e Khūrīān, and Ḩājjīābād-e Khvorīān) is a village in Howmeh Rural District, in the Central District of Semnan County, Semnan Province, Iran. At the 2006 census, its population was 14, in 5 families.

References 

Populated places in Semnan County